Cassia laevigata is a synonym for the plants:
 Senna occidentalis, coffee senna
 Senna septemtrionalis, arsenic bush